Romano Joël Denneboom (born 29 January 1981) is a Dutch former professional footballer who played as a striker.

Club career
Born in Schiedam, Denneboom began his career in amateur football with Hekelingen and VV Spijkenisse. After turning professional in 1998 with Heerenveen, Denneboom has also played in the Netherlands for Willem II, NEC, Twente and Sparta Rotterdam. While playing for NEC in July 2004, Denneboom turned down a chance to sign for Scottish team Aberdeen as his wife was due to give birth.

After leaving Twente in the summer of 2010, Denneboom went on trial at Scottish Premier League club Hibernian in August 2010. By September 2010, the potential move to Hibernian stalled over the length of the contract on offer.

On 11 January 2011, Denneboom signed with Arminia Bielefeld until the end of the season.
On 16 November 2011, it was reported that he was on trial with Luton Town.

International career
Denneboom made one international appearance for Netherlands national team in a friendly against Liechtenstein on 3 September 2004. During this match he was replaced at half time by Dirk Kuyt, who also made his first international appearance.

References

1981 births
Living people
Footballers from Schiedam
Dutch sportspeople of Surinamese descent
Dutch footballers
Association football forwards
Netherlands international footballers
VV Spijkenisse players
SC Heerenveen players
Willem II (football club) players
NEC Nijmegen players
FC Twente players
Sparta Rotterdam players
Arminia Bielefeld players
FC Lienden players
DHC Delft players
Eredivisie players
Derde Divisie players
2. Bundesliga players
Dutch expatriate footballers
Expatriate footballers in Germany
Dutch expatriate sportspeople in Germany